Fujifilm FinePix S5800 (or FinePix S800 in some regions) is a digital camera released by Fujifilm in 2007 and intended for the enthusiastic amateur. It features eight megapixels and 480p video.

References

External links
Official product site

S5800